The 2007 NCAA Division I Men's Golf Championship was a golf tournament contested from May 30 to June 2, 2007 at the Golden Horseshoe Golf Club in Williamsburg, Virginia. It was the 69th NCAA Division I Men's Golf Championship and was hosted by Virginia Commonwealth University. The team championship was won by the Stanford Cardinal who captured their eighth national championship (and first since 1994) by twelve strokes over the Georgia Bulldogs in stroke play. The individual national championship was won by Jamie Lovemark from USC.

Venue
This was the first NCAA Division I Men's Golf Championship hosted at the Golden Horseshoe Golf Club in Williamsburg, Virginia; the tournament was hosted by Virginia Commonwealth University which is located nearby in Richmond, Virginia.

References

NCAA Men's Golf Championship
Golf in Virginia
NCAA Division I Men's Golf Championship
NCAA Division I Men's Golf Championship
NCAA Division I Men's Golf Championship
NCAA Division I Men's Golf Championship
NCAA Division I Men's Golf Championship